Lignoceric acid, or tetracosanoic acid, is the saturated fatty acid with formula . It is found in wood tar, various cerebrosides, and in small amounts in most natural fats. The fatty acids of peanut oil contain small amounts of lignoceric acid (1.1% – 2.2%). This fatty acid is also a byproduct of lignin production.

Reduction of lignoceric acid yields lignoceryl alcohol.

See also
List of saturated fatty acids

References

Fatty acids
Waxes
Papermaking
Alkanoic acids